The discography of Slade, an English rock band, consists of fifteen studio albums, fifty seven singles, four live albums, and twelve compilation albums.

Albums

Studio albums

Compilation albums

Box sets

Live albums

Extended plays

Singles

Promotional singles

"Merry Xmas Everybody" single
"Merry Xmas Everybody" was annually re-released for most of the eighties in the UK.

Since the 21st century, chart rules changed in many territories to allow downloads of old singles to re-enter the singles charts.

Videography

Videos
Slade in Flame (1975)
Wall of Hits (1991)
Inside Slade – The Singles 1971–1991 (2004)
The Very Best of Slade (2005)
Slade Alive! – The Ultimate Critical Review (2006)
Slade – Live at Koko (2015)

Music videos

See also
 List of songs recorded by Slade

References

External links
 Discography Original Line-up (Site under construction)
 Slayed site with forum
 

Rock music group discographies
Discographies of British artists